Augusto Martín Núñez (born 3 November 1992) is a professional golfer from Argentina. He is a member of the Korn Ferry Tour and previously played on the PGA Tour Latinoamérica.

Career
Núñez won his first tournament on the PGA Tour Latinoamérica during the 2016 season at the Flor de Caña Open. He beat Emilio Puma Domínguez and Eric Steger in a playoff after finishing at 25 under par. The win put Núñez in first place in the Order or Merit for that season.

Núñez finished the 2016 PGA Tour Latinoamérica season in second place in the Order of Merit, earning him a place in the Web.com Tour for the 2017 season. His best performance was runner-up in the Corales Puntacana Resort and Club Championship, one stroke behind the winner.

Professional wins (9)

PGA Tour Latinoamérica wins (3)

TPG Tour wins (2)

PGA Tour Latinoamérica Developmental Series wins (1)

Ángel Cabrera Tour wins (3)
2015 Fecha 4
2016 Fecha 1, Fecha 4

Team appearances
Aruba Cup (representing PGA Tour Latinoamérica): 2016 (winners)

See also
2022 Korn Ferry Tour Finals graduates

References

External links

Argentine male golfers
PGA Tour Latinoamérica golfers
PGA Tour golfers
Korn Ferry Tour graduates
People from Tucumán Province
Sportspeople from Buenos Aires
1992 births
Living people